Montgomery Lake is located near Paddock Lake, Wisconsin and is North of 83rd Street and 258th Avenue. It is one of twenty-six lakes in Kenosha County.

Notes

External links
Montgomery Lake website

Lakes of Kenosha County, Wisconsin
Lakes of Wisconsin